A drive-in restaurant is one where a customer can drive in with an automobile for service. For example, customers park their vehicles and are usually served by staff who walk out to take orders and return with food, encouraging diners to remain parked while they eat. Often, the restaurant staff attach a serving tray to a window of the vehicle.

It is usually distinguished from a drive-through. At a drive-through restaurant, conversely, customers wait in a line and pass by one or more windows to order, pay, and receive their food.

Drive-in restaurants

 A&W (Canada)
 A&W Restaurants
 B&K Rootbeer, Midwestern U.S.
 Big Boy Restaurants
 Checkers and Rally's
 The Chickenburger, Bedford, Nova Scotia, Canada
 Circus Drive-In, until 2017, New Jersey, U.S.
 Dee's Drive-In (now Hardee's)
 Dick's Drive-In, Seattle, Washington, U.S.
 Dog n Suds, Midwestern U.S.
 Gibeau Orange Julep, Montreal, Quebec, Canada
 Ivanhoe's Restaurant, Upland, Indiana, U.S.
 Jim's Restaurants, Texas, U.S.
 The Kegs Drive-In, Grand Forks, North Dakota, U.S.
 Kirby's Pig Stand
 Matt's Place Drive-In, Butte, Montana, U.S.
 Mel's Drive-In, San Francisco, California, U.S. (since demolished)
 Mike's Drive-In, Oregon, U.S.
 Mug-n-Bun, Speedway, Indiana, U.S.
 Sonic Drive-In
 Stewart's Restaurants
 Sugarpine Drive-In, Troutdale, Oregon, U.S.
 Superdawg, Chicago, Illinois, U.S.
 Swensons, Ohio, U.S.
 The Varsity, Atlanta, Georgia, U.S.
 White Spot
 Zesto Drive-In

See also
 Carhop
 List of drive-in theaters
 Lists of restaurants

External links
 

Drive-in